Dmitri Sergeyevich Golyshev (born 17 November 1985) is a former Russian professional footballer.

He is a brother of Pavel Golyshev.

References

1985 births
Footballers from Moscow
Living people
Russian footballers
Russian expatriate footballers
Expatriate footballers in Latvia
Russian Premier League players
FC Khimki players
FC Daugava players
Russian expatriate sportspeople in Latvia
Association football midfielders